Yekan-e Kahriz (also Romanized as Yekān-e Kahrīz; also known as Ashaga Yechan, Echan Ashāghi, Eshan Pā’īn, Kahrīz Yekān, Yekān-e Kahrīz-e Soflá, Yekān Kahrīz, Yekān Kahrīz-e Pā’īn, and Yekān Kahrīz Pā’īn) is a village in Yekanat Rural District of Yamchi District, Marand County, East Azerbaijan province, Iran. At the 2006 National Census, its population was 2,118 in 526 households. The following census in 2011 counted 1,926 people in 575 households. The latest census in 2016 showed a population of 1,694 people in 530 households; it was the largest village in its rural district.

References 

Marand County

Populated places in East Azerbaijan Province

Populated places in Marand County